The London New Year's Day Parade (LNYDP) is an annual parade through the streets of the West End of London on 1 January. The parade first took place in 1987, as the Lord Mayor of Westminster's Big Parade. The parade was renamed in 1994, and for 2000 only it was called the Millennium Parade.

The parade went virtual in 2021 but returned live for 2022, albeit scaled-down, due to COVID-19 pandemic. 500,000 spectators attended the 2023 parade.

Organisation
The London parade is the biggest New Year's Day street event of its kind. It attracts around a million live spectators and US television network PBS (more than 250 stations) cover the entire event live, reaching millions of viewers world-wide. There is ticket-only grandstand seating at various points along the route. Destination Events Ltd. are the organisers of London's New Year's Day Parade (LNYDP).

Parade route  

The parade route is two miles (3.2 km) long. Before 2010 it began at Parliament Square in Westminster, continuing along Parliament Street and Whitehall to Trafalgar Square. It then continued along Cockspur Street and Regent Street. The final section was along Piccadilly and the parade ended at Green Park.

In 2010 the parade route was reversed to "appease US television broadcasters" and to "give the American audience the best views of the capital's landmarks, such as the Elizabeth Tower of the Palace of Westminster (The Houses of Parliament, also known as Big Ben) and Trafalgar Square". The revised route started at the Ritz Hotel, along Piccadilly to Piccadilly Circus, down Regent Street, then along Pall Mall to Trafalgar Square, then along Whitehall to Parliament Square.

Participants

The parade is used to raise funds for charities in London and representatives from each of the 32 London boroughs are encouraged to take part as a "borough entry", judged as part of the event. London's New Year's Parade (LNYDP) has raised “the best part of £2 million” for London charities since its inception. The competition did not take place in 2021 or 2022 due to the Covid 19 pandemic.

Marching bands

The Pride of New Mexico Marching Band from New Mexico State University was the first collegiate marching band to participate in the parade. The band, under the direction of George Hattendorf, marched in the first Lord Mayor of Westminster's Big Parade in 1987. The Marching 97 of Lehigh University performed in 2018.

The Shawnee Mission West High School marching band from Overland Park, Kansas, USA, has marched in the parade nine times. The 130-member Dixie Heights High School Marching Colonels from Edgewood, Kentucky performed in the parade in 1991 led by Band Director Daryl Angel. The 240-member Walker Valley High School Band from Cleveland, Tennessee, directed by Alan Hunt, and the vocal ensemble from the same school, marched in the 2007 parade. The vocal ensemble was also honoured by being asked to start the parade off by singing the British national anthem. The 140-member marching band from Fort Myers High School in Florida, USA, were initially prohibited from taking part in the 2007 parade because US education officials feared they might be caught in a terrorist attack. The decision was later overruled. The school also hosted the two winners of that year's BBC London competition.

Other American high school groups that have performed include the Leslie Blackhawk Marching Band from Leslie, Michigan (1992), the Goshen High School Marching Band, Goshen Indiana.  Aberdeen High School Marching Eagle, from Aberdeen, Maryland, the Troy High School marching band from Troy, Michigan, the Deep Run Marching Wildcats of Glen Allen, VA, the Blue Valley West Marching Band from Overland Park, Kansas, Turpin High School marching band from Cincinnati, Ohio, and the Golden Eagle Marching Band from Fleming Island, Florida.  The Stone Bridge High School Marching Bulldogs from Ashburn, Virginia, the Troy High School Trojan Marching Band from Troy, Ohio performs every 4 years, and the Menchville High School Marching Monarchs from Newport News, Virginia, who have performed in the parade twice, in 2009 and 2014. The Briar Woods High School marching band, also from Ashburn, Virginia, performed in 2011. The Gilbert High School Tiger Pride Marching Band from Gilbert, Arizona in 2015 and 2021 (Now pushed back to 2022), The Mountain View High School Toro Marching Band from Mesa, Arizona in 2016, The Verrado High School Viper Vanguard Marching Band from Buckeye, Arizona in 2018, The Desert Mountain High School Marching Band from Scottsdale, Arizona in 2015 and 2019, The Waubonsie Valley High School Marching Warriors from Aurora, Illinois performed in 2006. The 150-member Murphy High School Mighty Marching Panthers from Mobile, Alabama performed in 1989 receiving top honors. The Prior Lake High School marching band performed on several occasions, most recently in 2006.

In 1993, The East Coweta High School Marching Band (Sharpsburg, Ga.) performed in The New Year’s Day Parade and concluded with a performance at the Royal Albert hall with Finale led by their Director Tam H. Easterwood.

In 1996, the Sandy Creek High School Marching band (located in Tyrone, GA) performed at the New Year's Day Parade.

In 1998, the Council Rock Marching Band from Newtown, PA lead off the parade. 

The Clinton High School band from Clinton, Tennessee performed in the 2003 parade.

In 2010, the Legacy High School (Broomfield, Colorado) Lightning Marching Band performed in the parade.
 
Southmoore High School in Oklahoma performed in 2016.

In 2014, for the first time a marching band from Latin America participated, representing Panama, the Banda de Música Víctor Raúl González of Colegio Moisés Castillo Ocaña (MCO Marching Band) of La Chorrera shook London's soil with their performance in Trafalgar Square and was the marching band that opened London's New Year's Day Parade 2014.

In 2019, The Pride of the Treasure Coast, the Vero Beach Fighting Indians Band from Vero Beach, Florida performed in the parade.

In 2019, The 2018-2019 Pride of Bixby Marching Band from Bixby, Oklahoma performed in the parade. Bixby Bands Wind Ensembles also performed in two London venues prior to the parade.

In 2019, the Blue Valley Northwest High School Band from Overland Park, Kansas performed.

In 2019, the Robert E. Fitch Sr. High School Band from Groton, Connecticut performed. The High School Choir also performed at the London International Choral Festival.

In 2020, the West Boca Raton High school Vanguard Marching Band from Boca Raton, FL performed, playing 'God Save the Queen' in the parade finale.

In 2020, for the first time, the Campo Verde High School Coyote Pride Marching band from Gilbert, Arizona performed.

In 2020, the Hempfield Area High School Band from Greensburg, Pennsylvania performed. 

In 2020, the Brunswick High School Marching Blue Devils from Brunswick, Ohio performed

In 2020, the Nogales High School Noble Regiment from La Puente, California performed

In 2020, the West Orange High School band from Winter Garden, Florida performed.

In 2020, the Lake Nona High School Sound of the Lions from Orlando, Florida performed.

In 2020, the Parkview High School Marching Band from Lilburn, Georgia performed.

In 2020, the Newport High School Marching Band from Bellevue, Washington performed.

In 2020, the Marshall University Marching Thunder from Huntington, West Virginia performed.

In 2021, the Blue Jay Pride Marching Band from Liberty, Missouri performed, virtually.

In 2018 and 2023, the Santa Fe High School marching band from Edmond, Oklahoma performed.

The 2014 parade included the 100-member marching band Banda de Musica Colegio Moisés Castillo Ocaña from Panama.

Scouts
Over 200 Scouts from across London, led by the Enfield District Scout Band, took part in the 2007 parade, heralding the start of the UK's "2007 Centenary of Scouting Celebrations".

London's town crier is also part of the parade.

Musical groups 

In 2019 Megan McKenna sung a duet with US country music performer Kaleb Lee. 
Alongside Megan McKenna, illusionist Andrew Lee became the first Malaysian to take part in London's New Year's Day Parade.
In 2021, the British K-pop girl group Kaachi, gave a virtual performance. Jamie Cullum and Sophie Ellis-Bextor added to the virtual spectacular in 2021, joining KAACHI and other performers.
Television and Broadway star Marisha Wallace headlined LNYDP 2022 alongside a roster including The Voice UK winner Molly Hocking and DJ Bodalia.

The 2023 parade featured headline performances from Scouting For Girls and Toploader.

References

External links
Official website

1987 establishments in England
Annual events in London
January events
Media and communications in the City of Westminster
New Year celebrations
Parades in London
Recurring events established in 1987
Winter events in England